Niu Hongguang (born October 1951) is a lieutenant general in the People's Liberation Army of China. He was a delegate to the 11th National People's Congress.

Biography
Niu was born in Anqiu County (now Anqiu), Shandong, in October 1951. He attended the Affiliated High School of Peking University and graduated from the Central Party School of the Chinese Communist Party.

He enlisted in the People's Liberation Army (PLA) in 1968, serving in the Communication Regiment of the 20th Base (Jiuquan Satellite Launch Center) of the Commission for Science, Technology and Industry for National Defense, and eventually served as deputy commander. He rose to become deputy head of the People's Liberation Army General Armaments Department in June 2009, concurrently serving as deputy chief commander of the China Manned Space Program. He retired in December 2014.

He was promoted to the rank of major general (shaojiang) in July 1999 and lieutenant general (zhongjiang) in July 2010.

References

1951 births
Living people
People from Anqiu
Central Party School of the Chinese Communist Party alumni
People's Liberation Army generals from Shandong
People's Republic of China politicians from Shandong
Chinese Communist Party politicians from Shandong
Delegates to the 11th National People's Congress